The High Rockies, or high country, is a term for a region of the U.S. state of Colorado. It commonly includes Larimer County, Jackson County, Routt County, Grand County, Summit County, Eagle County, Lake County, and Pitkin County. Some notable towns there include Estes Park, Walden, Steamboat Springs, Grand Lake, Winter Park, Breckenridge, Dillon, Vail, Leadville, and Aspen. The geography of the High Rockies has some of the most rugged parts of the Rocky Mountains and consists of the Front Range and mountainous topography to the west, much of which is on or near the Continental Divide. Known for pine forests and winding roads, the former mining towns there have been reinvented by wilderness tourism such as hiking, cycling, fishing, and most especially both cross-country and alpine skiing. Notable ski resorts include Copper Mountain, Keystone Resort, Steamboat Ski Resort, Beaver Creek Resort, Buttermilk, Aspen Highlands, Snowmass, and Aspen Mountain. The High Rockies are also the location of Rocky Mountain National Park and Arapaho National Forest.

Climate of the Rocky Mountains
Regions of Colorado
Rocky Mountain National Park